Douglas Hume (4 May 1928 – 26 April 2009) was a British sailor. He competed in the 6 Metre event at the 1948 Summer Olympics.

References

External links
 

1928 births
2009 deaths
British male sailors (sport)
Olympic sailors of Great Britain
Sailors at the 1948 Summer Olympics – 6 Metre
Sportspeople from Melbourne